Astron may refer to:

 Mitsubishi Astron engine
 ASTRON, the Dutch foundation for astronomy research, operating the Westerbork Synthesis Radio Telescope and LOFAR
 Astron (comics), a fictional character, a member of the Marvel Comics group The Eternals
 Astron (spacecraft), Soviet ultraviolet space telescope
 Astron (fusion reactor), a fusion power design from the 1960s
 Astron (wristwatch), the world's first quartz wristwatch by Seiko
 The fourth month in the Shire Calendar
 Van Hool T917 Astron, a coach body
 Astron (ship), a Russian cargo vessel wrecked off the coast of the Dominican Republic